Elham Anafjeh (born 14 February 1998) is an Iranian footballer who played as a defender. She has been a member of the Iran women's national team. She is also a futsal player.

Early life
Anafjeh was born in Shushtar.

International career
Anafjeh capped for Iran at senior level during the 2018 AFC Women's Asian Cup qualification.

References 

1998 births
Living people
People from Shushtar
Iranian women's footballers
Women's association football defenders
Iran women's international footballers
Iranian women's futsal players
Sportspeople from Khuzestan province
21st-century Iranian women